Captain Robert Henry Dundas Bolton OBE (13 January 1893 – 30 October 1964) was an Indian Army and British Army officer, police officer and English first-class cricketer.

Military and police career
Bolton was born in Mysore, India and was schooled at Rossall, Fleetwood before being commissioned into the Indian Army Reserve as an Officer 13 November 1914. He served in German East Africa from 27 November 1914 to 3 September 1916 with the 101st Grenadiers. He was promoted to lieutenant 13 November 1915. The regiment was transferred to Palestine and here he saw service from 4 September 1916 to 31 October 1918. He was transferred to the 2nd battalion 101st Grenadiers on its formation at Suez on 3 February 1917. On 4 June 1917 he was appointed to the Indian Army as a lieutenant with seniority from 13 August 1916. He was made acting captain between 6 February and 8 December 1919 before being promoted to captain 13 August 1919. He saw service in Waziristan between 1919 and 1921.

On 18 November 1921, as a captain, he transferred to the Duke of Wellington's Regiment of the British Army. He retired in 1933 and then joined the Metropolitan Police. From 1941 to 1960, he served as Chief Constable of Northamptonshire Constabulary.

Cricket career
Bolton was a right-handed batsman. He made his debut in County Cricket for Dorset in the 1910 Minor Counties Championship against Carmarthenshire. Bolton represented Dorset sixteen times. Bolton's final game for Dorset came in 1912 against Devon.

Bolton made his first-class debut for Hampshire in 1913 against Cambridge University. Bolton made two first-class appearances for Hampshire in 1913, his second match coming against Warwickshire.

Bolton did not represent the club in the 1914 County Championship, which was curtailed due to the start of the First World War.

Eight years after last representing Hampshire in the County Championship, Bolton returned in 1922, where he made his return debut against Nottinghamshire. Cowie played four more matches for Hampshire, with his final first-class match coming against Somerset in 1922.

During his time with Northamptonshire Constabulary, he also acted as a team selector for Northamptonshire.

Bolton died in St Pancras, London on 30 October 1964.

References

External links
Robert Bolton at Cricinfo
Robert Bolton at CricketArchive

1893 births
1964 deaths
Cricketers from Mysore
English cricketers
Dorset cricketers
Hampshire cricketers
Indian Army personnel of World War I
British Indian Army officers
Duke of Wellington's Regiment officers
Metropolitan Police officers
British Chief Constables
Officers of the Order of the British Empire